Louis Bisilliat (25 February 1931 – 5 May 2010) was a French racing cyclist. He finished in last place in the 1959 Tour de France.

References

External links
 

1931 births
2010 deaths
French male cyclists
Sportspeople from Savoie
Cyclists from Auvergne-Rhône-Alpes